Elliot Goblet is a comedy character created by the Australian comedian Jack Levi. The character is known for the deadpan delivery of one-line jokes. The style compares with the American comedian Steven Wright but developed independently. At first Goblet appeared with round glasses and a goatee beard, but the beard was later removed.

Created with assistance from Australian comedy teacher Pete Crofts, the Goblet character was launched onto the comedy scene with numerous TV performances on Hey Hey It's Saturday, The Midday Show, The Eleventh Hour, The Footy Show, Neighbours and other Australian TV variety and sketch shows.
 
As Goblet, Levi recorded the ARIA award-nominated CD Internally Berserk, wrote the book Business According To Goblet and has appeared in short films as well as the feature film Fat Pizza. He has also hosted the Qantas comedy audio program on all of their flights worldwide.

Levi has performed as Goblet around Australia as well as in seven other countries, including the United States and England. 

Together with Mitchell Faircloth (aka "Slim Whittle"), Levi created the Crimson Goat Cabaret Club and they produced over 30 variety and cabaret shows.

In April 2015 a new comedy album, Goblet's Greatest Bits, was released and a portion of the proceeds from the album are going to two causes, the Father Bob Maguire Foundation and the Les Twentyman Foundation.

These days he is an in-demand wedding master of ceremonies and corporate comedian.

Discography

Albums

Singles

Awards and nominations

ARIA Music Awards
The ARIA Music Awards are a set of annual ceremonies presented by Australian Recording Industry Association (ARIA), which recognise excellence, innovation, and achievement across all genres of the music of Australia. They commenced in 1987. 

! 
|-
| 2000 || Internally Berserk || ARIA Award for Best Comedy Release ||  || 
|-

References

External links
Official website

Australian stand-up comedians
Australian male comedians
Australian male film actors
Australian people of Israeli descent
Jewish male comedians
Israeli stand-up comedians
Israeli male film actors
Australian Jews
Fictional Australian people
Fictional Jews
Comedy television characters
Comedy theatre characters
Theatre characters introduced in 1981
Television characters introduced in 1981
Comedians from Melbourne
Male characters in theatre
Male characters in television